The 2020 Super W season was the third edition of the women's Super W competition in Australia. The playoff and final were cancelled due to the COVID-19 pandemic, the NSW Waratahs were dubbed champions after an undefeated season.

Teams

Regular season

Standings

Results

Round 1

Round 2

Round 3

Round 4

Round 5

Finals 
The NSW Waratahs Women were undefeated in the regular season. They were to host the Final in Sydney after the playoff between Queensland Reds Women and Brumbies Women. The Finals were postponed to late May, but Rugby Australia decided to formally conclude the season due to the COVID-19 pandemic.

See also 

 Women's rugby union

References 

2020
2020 in Australian rugby union
2020 in women's rugby union
2020 in Australian women's sport